Neduvasal is a village in Pudukkottai district, Tamil Nadu, India.

Demographics
As per the 2006 census, Neduvasal had a total population of 5030 with 2650 males and 2380 females.

Protest
This is a place where the protests intensified for the Hydrocarbon fracking to mine gas  decision from the central govt of India where people of  Neduvasal are Agitating against decision of the Government as it can pollute water and land here used for Agriculture'

Attractions
The villages around Neduvasal are covered with picturesque coconut plantations. The town is home to the Lord Sri Nadiamman Temple, the Lord Padrakaliyamman Temple, and the Thiruvalluvar Temple.

Manora, 30 km east of Neduvasal, is an eight-story tower built by the Maratha King Serfoji II in 1814 to commemorate the victory of the British over Napoleon Bonaparte at Waterloo. From the top of the tower there is a panoramic view of the palm-fringed Bay of Bengal. The tower has also served as a lighthouse.

This is a place where the protests intensified for the Hydrocarbon fracking to mine gas  decision from the central govt of India where people of  Neduvasal are Agitating against decision of the Government as it can pollute water and land here used for Agriculture.

Surrounding villages
The town is surrounded by a cluster of 15 villages:
Karambakudi
Peravurani
Pattukottai
Pullanviduthi
Aranthangi
Avanam
Thiruchitrambalam
Thennangudi
Vadakadu
Karukkagurichi
Vembangudi/Paingal
Kalathur
Veeriyankottai
Kuruvikarambai
Nadiyam
Thuraiyur
Mudapulikadu (Peravurani)
Andakottai

Schools and colleges near Neduvasal
 M. S. Swaminathan Research Foundation, Neduvasal
Govt. Higher Secondary School, Neduvasal
Panchayat Union Primary School, Anna Nagar Neduvasal
Govt. Higher Secondary School, Avanam
Dr. Abdulkalam Polytechnic College, Avanam
Sri Venkateswara College of Arts & Science, Peravurani
Muvendar Matriculation Higher Secondary School, Peravurani
Dr. J. C. Kumarappa Centenary Vidya Mandir Matric Higher Secondary School
V. R. Veerappa Higher Secondary School, Peravurani
Govt. Boys Higher Secondary School, Andavan kovil, Peravurani
Govt. Girls Higher Secondary School, Pookollai, Peravurani
 Atlantic's International School Kuruvikarambai-Peravurani.
Sri Venkateshwara CBSE School Peravurani.
SMR East Coast Engineering College Peravurani TK
Government Arts and Science College-Peravurani.

References

External links
Soil testing drive in Pudukottai district

Villages in Pudukkottai district